Edward Maplesden (by 1558 – 4 August 1626), of Maidstone, Kent, was an English politician.

He was a Member (MP) of the Parliament of England for Maidstone in 1625.

References

16th-century births
1626 deaths
English MPs 1625
People from Maidstone